6P/d'Arrest (also known as d'Arrest's Comet or Comet d'Arrest) is a periodic Jupiter-family comet in the Solar System, orbiting between Mars and Jupiter. It passed  from the Earth on August 12, 1976. The most recent perihelion passage took place on September 17, 2021, when the comet had a solar elongation of 95 degrees at approximately apparent magnitude of 10.

The comet last came to perihelion (closest approach to the Sun) on March 2, 2015, but it was in an unfavorable apparition as it had a solar elongation of less than 30 degrees from October 2014 until May 2015.

In 1991, Andrea Carusi and Giovanni B. Valsecchi (Istituto Astrofisica Spaziale, Rome), and Ľubor Kresák and Margita Kresáková (Slovak Astronomical Institute, Bratislava) independently suggested this comet was the same as a comet observed by Philippe de La Hire in 1678.

It was first observed by Heinrich Ludwig d'Arrest, in Leipzig, Germany, on 28th and 30 June 1851.

The comet nucleus is estimated at about 3.2 km in diameter.

6P/d was one of a trio of comets targeted by the ill-fated CONTOUR mission, an unmanned discovery program mission, that was launched but contact was lost soon after reaching orbit.

If it had been functional, the planned date for CONTOUR's study of d'Arrest would have been 2008, after visiting two other comets.

Around 2007, 6P/d was one of nine comets examined for a comet sample return mission study. In the 2010s a comet surface sample return mission was selected as the New Frontiers Program finalist, but the recently studied comet 67P was chosen as the selected target.

See also
List of missions to comets

References

External links 
 Orbital simulation from JPL (Java) / Horizons Ephemeris
 6P/d'Arrest at CometBase database
 Elements and Ephemeris for 6P/d'Arrest – Minor Planet Center
 6P/d'Arrest – Seiichi Yoshida @ aerith.net
 6P – Gary W. Kronk's Cometography

Periodic comets
0006
Comets in 2015
20210917
18510628